Quo Vadis (born 1952) was an outstanding Quarter Horse show mare as well as being an outstanding broodmare in the early days of the American Quarter Horse Association (or AQHA).

Life

Quo Vadis was foaled 1952 and bred by Ross Roberts of San Jon, New Mexico. She was a black mare, owned at the time of registration by Marianne Randals of Snyder, Texas. Both her sire and her dam's sire were products of the King Ranch linebreeding program, so Quo Vadis was descended from Old Sorrel twice. She also traced five times to Peter McCue as well as once to Traveler.

Show career
In Quo Vadis' show career, she earned an AQHA Championship as well as a Performance Register of Merit. She earned a total of forty open halter points with the AQHA, and twenty-nine open performance points. She earned points in cutting, working cow horse, reining, and western riding. She also earned $208.40 in National Cutting Horse Association (or NCHA) cutting competition.

Broodmare record
After Quo Vadis' show career, she retired to become a broodmare. She had twelve foals in total. Eleven of them earned AQHA points in halter. Four of them became AQHA Champions – Mr. Perfection, Poco Becky, Bonita Dondi, and Kaliman. Three foals earned a Superior Halter Horse award – Madonna Dell, Mr. Perfection, and Kaliman. She also foaled Majestic Dell, a stallion who earned forty-nine halter points, just one shy of his Superior Halter Horse.

Honors
Quo Vadis was inducted into the AQHA Hall of Fame in 2002.

Pedigree

Notes

References

 All Breed Pedigree Database Pedigree of Quo Vadis retrieved on June 26, 2007
 
 AQHA Hall of Fame accessed on September 1, 2017
 
 Quo Vadis NCHA Earnings retrieved on September 4, 2017

External links
 Quo Vadis at Quarter Horse Directory
 Quo Vadis at Quarter Horse Legends

American Quarter Horse show horses
American Quarter Horse broodmares
1952 animal births
AQHA Hall of Fame (horses)